Tu is a Chinese surname, and the 279th family name in Hundred Family Surnames (百家姓). Tu (涂 or 凃) is another Chinese surname.

Origin
From one of the characters in the name of the ancient city of Zoutu. The legendary emperor Yellow Emperor (2697–2595 BC) used this city as a military base.

People with the surname Tu (屠)
Tu Qihua (屠玘華), birth-name of the 20th century author Mei Zhi.
Tu Youyou (屠呦呦), Chinese medical scientist, winner of the 2011 Lasker Award and the 2015 Nobel Prize in Physiology or Medicine.
Tu Jida (屠基达), aircraft designer, "father of the Chengdu J-7" fighter.

People with the surname Tu (涂)
 Thor Chuan Leong (涂振龙), Malaysian professional snooker player
 Tu Mingjing (涂铭旌) (1928–2019), Chinese materials scientist
 Twu Shiing-jer (涂醒哲), Mayor of Chiayi City (2014-2018)

See also
Tú
Chinese-language surnames

Multiple Chinese surnames